Homemade Astronauts is a television show on The Science Channel (Discovery Science USA) and Discovery+, that started airing in 2021. It featured DIY wannabe astronauts, who design and build their own equipment, in an attempt to reach the edge of space. The people are average Americans building on their farms, ranches, garages, backyards.

History
Mike Hughes reached  altitude in a manned steam rocket in 2018, filmed for the series, setting a record for an amateur manned rocket.

Discovery Networks gave the greenlight for full series production in 2019, for airing on The Science Channel in 2020.

In March 2020, the show filmed an attempt by Kurt Anderson to break the world ice speed record in his rocket sled Arctic Arrow using a peroxide rocket, with the Rocketboys team.

Season 1 began airing in May 2021, having been filmed over 2.5 years, for a total of 4 episodes. Season 1 carries a dedication This series is dedicated to Michael "Mad Mike" Hughes 1956-2020. And it uses the title crawl "The newDIY space race is here. Tech giantsEveryday people are making history. They're using their billionscredit cards to fund their dreams."

Cast
Featured on the show include:

Team Hughes/Stakes
 Mike Hughes, professional daredeveil, wannabe astronaut
 Waldo Stakes, vehicle designer; builder of Hughes' manned rocket
 Stephanie, Waldo's daughter and team member
The Rocketboys (Team Michaelson/Anderson)
 Ky Michaelson, SFX artist and stuntman and amateur rocketeer, who in 2004 built the first amateur rocket that reached space at zenith of  up;
 Kurt Anderson, Rocketboys mechanical engineer, and Arctic Arrow rocket sled dragster pilot, wannabe astronaut
 David, Rocketboys electronics engineer
 Buddy Michaelson, son of Ky, Rocketboys parachute expert
Pacific Space Flight (Team Smith)
 Cameron Smith, doctor of anthropology and archaeology, and Portland State University anthropology professor, wannabe astronaut, who built his own spacesuit, and wanting to go to the edge of space
 Majorie, a student and part of Team Smith

Teams
Teams shown include:

 The Rocketboys: (Team Michaelson/Anderson) using a solid fuel rocket; attempting to build a manned space rocket to reach the edge of space, the McDowell Line
 Team Hughes/Stakes, using a balloon launch steam rocket rockoon to reach  up, the Karman Line
 Pacific Space Flight: (Team Smith) using a balloon; to reach the Armstrong Line ( or ), in a high altitude balloon

Episodes

See also
 Civilian Space eXploration Team
 Ansari X-Prize
 Billionaire space race
 Space 2.0

Notes

References

External links
 

2020s American television series
2021 American television series debuts
American non-fiction television series
Science Channel original programming
Private spaceflight